is a Japanese light novel series written by Hikaru Sugii, with illustrations by Mel Kishida. ASCII Media Works published nine volumes between January 2007 and September 2014 under their Dengeki Bunko imprint. A manga adaptation illustrated by Tiv was serialized between the August 2010 and September 2012 issues of ASCII Media Works' Dengeki Daioh magazine. A 12-episode anime adaptation aired in Japan between July and September 2011.

Plot
Narumi Fujishima is a high-school student who keeps himself uninvolved in school life to the point of not knowing most of his classmates' names. Because of some circumstances, he must participate in his school's "Gardening Committee", with Ayaka Shinozaki. He is also persuaded to join NEET, an amateur detective agency filled with unemployed slackers who take on and solve cases on their own. The NEET agency is led by "Alice", a childish, anti-social extreme shut-in, who never leaves her room full of computer monitors and stuffed animals. However, Alice has proven herself a resourceful hacker and an astounding detective. Throughout the series, Narumi, accompanied by the other members of NEET, solve crimes, including murders, using their limited resources and Alice's genius intellect.

Characters

 (anime), Atsushi Abe (drama CD)
 An ordinary 16-year-old high-school student who lives with his elder sister. He thinks he has become like this, alone and occupying time by himself, because he is always transferring schools dues to his dad's work. He is introduced to Hanamaru by his classmate Ayaka, through whom he meets Min, Alice, and the NEET Detective Team members.

 
 (anime), Minako Kotobuki (drama CD)
The mysterious female protagonist who lives on the third floor above the Hanamaru ramen shop. Her age is unknown, but looks like a 12- or 13-year-old girl. She has said that her diet has been heavy Dr. Pepper for more than 10 years. She is short and pale white and has long black hair. She calls herself Alice (a mixed reading of the kanji for Yūko) and a "NEET Detective". She is a hikikomori and a cracking genius. She has disclosed that she has never attended school, and that she ran away from home some time before deciding to become a NEET detective. Her diet contains little more than Dr. Pepper, orders of noodles, hold everything except the broth, and sometimes ice cream; on Min's insistence she sometimes eats vegetables, typically leeks. Min threatens to withhold the ice cream unless Alice eats something. She suffers from severe insomnia and tends to annoy people around her, eliciting angry responses. She usually wears bear-patterned pajamas and is typically surrounded by a pile of teddy bears. She is the brains of the NEET Detective Team and gathers information to solve the cases with her laptop without stepping out of her bedroom.

 (anime), Yōko Honda (drama CD)
Narumi's classmate, an active and cheerful girl who works part-time at a ramen shop called Hanamaru. She was the only member of the gardening club, but made Narumi join her, starting a friendship with him. Soon after, she inexplicably jumps off the school roof, injuring herself and falling into a coma. This motivates Narumi to make a request to Alice: find out why she jumped off from the roof. Ayaka eventually recovers consciousness but suffers amnesia and does not remember anything about Narumi.

 
 (anime), Fuyuka Oura (drama CD)
The current owner of the ramen shop Hanamaru, the one who takes care of the members of the NEET Detective Club. Her personality is generally brash and tomboyish, often talking to people with a tone usually more masculine than what her looks suggest. However, she is as caring inside as she is harsh, as proven by her unrelenting support for the NEET Detective Club in spite of its members not being able to return the favor.

 
 (anime), Kenji Takahashi (drama CD)
One of the NEET Detective Team members, an ex-boxer addicted to gambling, especially dice games, pachinko, and horse races. He dropped out of Narumi's high school an unspecified number of years ago, and has connections with the local police.

 
 (anime), Nobuhiko Okamoto (drama CD)
One of the NEET Detective Team members, a university student whose appearance is that of an elementary-school boy. He rarely attends classes and stays enrolled only to use the university library. He is a military otaku who spends most of his time playing survival games, is always carrying model guns and wearing a camouflage outfit, and is an expert on spying devices.

 
 (anime), Junji Majima (drama CD)
One of the NEET Detective Team members and the only one with a driver's license. Because of his very handsome and gentle appearance he is quite popular among girls, having numerous girlfriends at the same time. Narumi thinks of him as a gigolo. Hiro is often seen with two cellphones, writing romantic text messages to two different girls at the same time. He collects information or pictures and is an expert in investigation.

 
 (anime), Kenta Miyake (drama CD)
The head and one of the founding members of a young NEET yakuza group called the Hirasaka Group. He has a ferocious look and a violent attitude. He hires Alice to find the source of the drug 'Angel Fix' in the first novel, and has hired her several times before and after. He often lends a hand to Alice's cases. He is also good at textile arts and responds to Alice's calls when one of her stuffed bears needs repair.

 

A fourteen-year-old Thai girl with apparently brown skin whose father, Masaya Kusakabe, is a Japanese man who married a Thai woman who died in Japan. She has been in Japan since she was five, so she speaks Japanese fluently. Meo asks the NEET Detective Team to search for her missing father after he phones requiring her to take a bag containing two hundred million yen banknotes and leave for any safe place. Her nickname, Meo, is derived from "Maeo", a Thai word meaning cat; her first name, Charuni, is a Thai word derived from Pāḷi, Cāruṇī, meaning a young pretty girl.

The former leader and one of the founding of a young NEET yakuza group called the Hirasaka Group who broke his oath as a sworn brother to the Fourth after their roommate Hisan was supposedly killed. He is known as the person who originally designed the Hirasaka Group emblem, albeit unfinished.

Media

Light novels
The Heaven's Memo Pad light novels are written by Hikaru Sugii, with illustrations by Mel Kishida. ASCII Media Works published nine volumes between January 2007 and September 2014 under their Dengeki Bunko imprint.

Drama CD
Three drama CDs were produced by Lantis. The first, titled , was released on July 8, 2009. The second, titled , was released on May 7, 2010. A third drama CD titled  was released on November 9, 2011, casting the same voice actors from the anime.

Manga
A manga adaptation illustrated by Tiv was serialized in ASCII Media Works' Dengeki Daioh between the August 2010 and September 2012 issues. Three tankōbon volumes were released between April 4, 2011 and August 27, 2012 under ASCII Media Works' Dengeki Comics imprint.

Anime
An anime adaptation was announced in February 2011. It aired 12 episodes between July 2 and September 24, 2011 with J.C.Staff in charge of the animation. North American licensor Sentai Filmworks simulcast the series on The Anime Network, and released the series on DVD in 2012. The opening theme is "Kawaru Mirai" by ChouCho and the ending theme is "Asunaro" by Kenichi Suzumura.

Reception
As of July 2011, the light novels have sold over 1,000,000 copies in Japan. The light novel ranked at No. 10 in 2011 in Takarajimasha's annual light novel guide book Kono Light Novel ga Sugoi!. Theron Martin of Anime News Network published a positive review of the complete anime series in 2012. Despite his criticism towards Alice for being another moe archetype for the viewers and its glorification of NEETs, Martin praised the series for its well-conceived adaptation, its understated yet eclectic score and for tackling social issues found in Japan. He concluded by saying, "Overall, Heaven's Memo Pad is a very good series which falls short of being a great series...though the stories in between also have their moments."

References

External links
Official Kami-sama no Memo-chō anime website 
Kami-sama no Memo-chō at Dengeki Bunko 

2007 Japanese novels
2010 manga
2011 Japanese television series debuts
Anime and manga based on light novels
Anime series
Dengeki Bunko
Dengeki Comics
Dengeki Daioh
Kadokawa Dwango franchises
Detective anime and manga
J.C.Staff
Light novels
Shōnen manga
Sentai Filmworks
Television shows based on light novels